Charlene J. Sato or Charlene Junko Sato, called "Charlie" (25 June 1951, in Lahaina – 28 January 1996), was a linguist known for her contributions to pidgin and creole studies.

Life
Sato grew up in Wahiawa and attended Leilehua High School. She was married at the time of her death.

Education
Sato obtained a B.A. in linguistics at University of California, Berkeley in 1973, and an M.A. in linguistics at University of Hawaiʻi in 1978. She then completed a Ph.D. in Applied Linguistics at University of California, Los Angeles in 1985.

Career
Sato was a professor in the department of English as a Second Language at the University of Hawaiʻi for 14 years starting in 1982.

Activism
Sato worked to elevate the status of Hawaii Creole English, her native language. She also advocated for speakers of Hawaii English.
In 1987 Sato served as an expert witness in the case of  Kahakua et al. v. Hallgren, in which two English-speaking plaintiffs from Hawaii sued the US National Weather Service for discrimination. Sato demonstrated through phonetic analysis that the plaintiffs' speech was intelligible to mainland English speakers, which supported the case that they had been discriminated against rather than being unqualified for the positions they applied for. The judge, however, ruled that discrimination had not taken place, and suggested that the plaintiffs should learn to speak differently. Also in 1987, Sato fought the Hawaii State Board of Education's attempt to ban the use of Hawaii Creole English in the classroom, and helped establish the Hawaii Coordinating Council on Language Policy and Planning.

Publications
Sato, Charlene J. 1990. The Syntax of Conversation in Interlanguage Development. Doctoral dissertation.

References

External links
The Charlene Junko Sato Center for Pidgin, Creole, and Dialect Studies

1951 births
1996 deaths
Linguists from the United States
Women linguists
University of California, Berkeley alumni
University of Hawaiʻi at Mānoa alumni
University of California, Los Angeles alumni
University of Hawaiʻi at Mānoa faculty